Nupur is a feminine given name and a surname of Indian origin. People with that name include:

Given name
 Nupur Asthana (active from 1998), Indian film director and writer
 Nupur Mehta (born 1980), Indian actress
 Nupur Sharma, Indian politician

Surname
 Alka Nupur (active from 1979–1989), Indian actress

Other uses
 Nupur (album), see List of songs recorded by Zubeen Garg#Hindi non-film songs, 2001

See also
 Jol Nupur, a Bengali TV series which aired 2013-2015
 

Indian feminine given names
Surnames of Indian origin